The 1988 Atlanta Braves season was the 118th in franchise history and their 23rd in Atlanta.

Offseason
 November 13, 1987: Ken Griffey, Sr. was signed as a free agent by the Braves.
 December 6, 1987: Graig Nettles was signed as a free agent by the Braves.
December 8, 1987: Ed Whited was traded by the Houston Astros with Mike Stoker (minors) to the Atlanta Braves for Rafael Ramirez and cash. 
 March 24, 1988: Graig Nettles was purchased from the Braves by the Montreal Expos.

Regular season

Season standings

Record vs. opponents

Notable transactions
 May 17, 1988: Jerry Royster was signed as a free agent with the Atlanta Braves.
 May 20, 1988: Melvin Nieves was signed by the Braves as an amateur free agent.
 June 1, 1988: 1988 Major League Baseball draft
Steve Avery was drafted by the Braves in the 1st round (3rd pick). Player signed June 30, 1988.
Turk Wendell was drafted by the Braves in the 5th round. Player signed June 4, 1988.
 July 28, 1988: Ken Griffey, Sr. was released by the Braves.

Roster

Player stats

Batting

Starters by position
Note: Pos = Position; G = Games played; AB = At bats; H = Hits; Avg. = Batting average; HR = Home runs; RBI = Runs batted in

Other batters
Note: G = Games played; AB = At bats; H = Hits; Avg. = Batting average; HR = Home runs; RBI = Runs batted in

Pitching

Starting pitchers
Note: G = Games pitched; IP = Innings pitched; W = Wins; L = Losses; ERA = Earned run average; SO = Strikeouts

Other pitchers
Note: G = Games pitched; IP = Innings pitched; W = Wins; L = Losses; ERA = Earned run average; SO = Strikeouts

Relief pitchers
Note: G = Games pitched; W = Wins; L = Losses; SV = Saves; ERA = Earned run average; SO = Strikeouts

Farm system

Awards and honors
Dale Murphy, Roberto Clemente Award

References

1988 Atlanta Braves season at Baseball Reference
Atlanta Braves on Baseball Almanac

Atlanta Braves seasons
Atlanta Braves season